Jan Adams may refer to:

 Jan Adams (diplomat) (born 1963), Australian diplomat
 Jan Adams (surgeon) (born 1954), American surgeon, author, and television presenter